Antaeotricha leucocryptis is a moth in the family Depressariidae. It was described by Edward Meyrick in 1932. It is found in Colombia.

The wingspan is about 28 mm. The hindwings are blackish fuscous.

References

Moths described in 1932
leucocryptis
Moths of South America
Taxa named by Edward Meyrick